4-Bromoanisole is the organobromine compound with the formula CH3OC6H4Br.  It is colorless liquid with a pleasant smell similar to that of anise seed. It is one of three isomers of bromoanisole, the others being 3-bromoanisole and 2-bromoanisole.  It is the precursor to many 4-anisyl derivatives.

Reactions and uses
4-Bromoanisole forms a Grignard reagent, which reacts with phosphorus trichloride to give tris(4-methoxyphenyl)phosphine:
 3 CH3OC6H4MgBr  +  PCl3  →  (CH3OC6H4)3P + 3 MgBrCl
4-Bromoanisole forms the organozinc derivative CH3OC6H4ZnBr.

4-Bromoanisole is compound sometimes used in RNA extraction which serves to further eliminate DNA contamination.  It interacts with genomic DNA (gDNA) and through a separation phase, it will be located in the organic layer instead of the aqueous layer (upper layer) containing the RNA extract.

See also 
 Anisole

References

Phenol ethers
Bromoarenes